Arhopala eupolis, is a butterfly in the family Lycaenidae. It was described by William Henry Miskin
in 1890. It is found in the Australasian realm.

Subspecies
A. e. eupolis Queensland, Kai, Aru, New Guinea, Yule, Tagula, St. Aignan
A. e. asopus Waterhouse & Lyell, 1914 Northwest Australia, Groote Eylandt

Biology

The larva feeds on Dendrophthoe vitellina, Lagerstroemia speciosa, Eucalyptus intermedia , Melaleuca quinquenervia, Terminalia catappa, Terminalia melanocarpa, T. muelleri, and  T. sericocarpa.

References

External links

Arhopala Boisduval, 1832 at Markku Savela's Lepidoptera and Some Other Life Forms. Retrieved June 3, 2017.

Arhopala
Butterflies described in 1890